Gardens (or The Gardens) is an inner-city suburb of Cape Town located just to the south of the city centre located in the higher elevations of the "City Bowl" and directly beneath Table Mountain and Lion's Head. It is an affluent neighbourhood populated mostly by young professionals and contains numerous chic restaurants, hotels, boutique shops and loft apartments. The suburb is also a hub for the Cape Town creative industry, home to e.tv at Longkloof Studios and many modelling agencies, production and publishing companies and associated industries.

History
In the early years, the Cape was used as an anchorage for Portuguese, Dutch and British ships.
No permanent settlement existed until the Dutch East India Company issued a mandate to Jan van Riebeeck, a ship's surgeon, to establish a settlement which could provide passing ships with fruit, vegetables and fresh meat (traded from the natives).

In 1652 the first garden was laid out by Hendrik Boom, the Company's master gardener, on a site close to the Fresh River (near to the Grand Parade). Later that year, the garden crossed the Fresh River (where Adderley Street is today), and included a medicine garden. Within a few years it was 18 hectares in size.

As more produce became available from  the Company's gardens at Newlands and from the Free Burghers who had settled along the Liesbeeck River, the town garden was slowly converted into a botanical and ornamental garden, although the growing of vegetables did continue for a number of years.

The famous kilometre-long Government Avenue, which runs from the top of Adderley Street, also known as 'The Gardens', was originally planted with lemon trees and in 1700 with orange trees. During the time of Simon van der Stel, it was lined with oak trees, which remain today.

Places of interest 

 The first statue erected in South Africa, that of Sir George Grey can be found in front of the Public Library.
 The South African Museum, the oldest in the country, was established in 1825.
 The small Jewish museum, housed in the original synagogue, known as 'The Gardens Shul', is the oldest in Southern Africa built in 1862. The twin-towered 'new' synagogue was built in 1905.
 At the top end of Government Avenue is Cape Town High School, built on the grounds of which once stood the Hope Mill, one of five water mills which operated along the banks of the Fresh River.
 Belmond Mount Nelson Hotel, one of the oldest and most historic hotels in all of Africa
Also within the Gardens area can be found the Iziko South African Museum, The Planetarium, the Iziko National Gallery and the Michaelis School of Fine Art.

Education

 Cape Town High School
 Jan Van Riebeeck Primary School
 Hoërskool Jan van Riebeeck
 Lycée Français du Cap, the secondary division of the Cape Town French School, is located in Gardens.
 St. Cyprian's School

References

Suburbs of Cape Town